Mangalore–Hassan–Mysore line is a railway route of both Southern and South Western Railway zone of Indian Railways. This route plays an important role in rail transportation of Mysore division of Karnataka state.

It is divided into two sections:  —  and Hassan — .

History 
The main railway line from Hassan to Mangalore section was originally built as a metre-gauge line and was opened in small sections between 1976 and 1977, inaugurated finally on 20 May 1979 for passenger transportation. 17 years later it was closed for gauge conversion, on 20 September 1996. The gauge conversion of this section was handed over to a Special Purpose Vehicle (SPV), formed for the task – the Hassan Mangalore Rail Development Company Limited (HMRDC). The company has the Government of Karnataka and the Railway Ministry as majority stakeholders, while Mangalore port trust and a couple of other bodies as minority stakeholders.

The gauge conversion took a very long time and is marked in red-letters in the Indian Railways' history. Although the first section after the conversion was opened in January 1998, the rest of the works were done at very slow pace. The first sub-section to be opened was  – Sakleshpur, a distance of about 42 km. The remaining final stretch (Sakleshpur–Subrahmanya), a ghat section with 1 in 55 grades all along, was opened in May 2006 for freight services and in December 2007 for passenger operations.

As per the Railway Budget 1995–96, the Hassan–Mysore section was also proposed to gauge conversion to 5ft 6in broad gauge. Before that, the Hassan–Mysore section was also opened on 3 January 1918 as a metre-gauge line.

Projects 
There is a proposal for doubling the Mangalore–Hassan–Mysore line with electrification for reduction of time travelling between the coastal and plateau regions of Karnataka which will be a boon for the economy on this route.

References

5 ft 6 in gauge railways in India
Rail transport in Karnataka
Transport in Mangalore
Transport in Hassan district
Transport in Mysore